John Schofield VC (4 March 1892 – 9 April 1918) was an English recipient of the Victoria Cross, the highest and most prestigious award for gallantry in the face of the enemy that can be awarded to British and Commonwealth forces.

Before joining up, he attended Arnold School in Blackpool. Numerous memorials to his actions during the war can be found in the school's foyer and a plaque commemorating his VC can be found outside the school's memorial hall, inside of which the names of all the fallen old boys can be found.

He was 26 years old, and a Temporary second lieutenant in the 2/5th Battalion, Lancashire Fusiliers, British Army during the First World War when the following deed took place for which he was awarded the VC.

His Victoria Cross is displayed at the Fusilier Museum, Bury, England.

References

Further reading
The Four Blackburn VC's (HL Kirby and RR Walsh)
Monuments to Courage (David Harvey, 1999)
The Register of the Victoria Cross (This England, 1997)
VCs of the First World War - Spring Offensive 1918 (Gerald Gliddon, 1997)

British World War I recipients of the Victoria Cross
Lancashire Fusiliers officers
British Army personnel of World War I
People educated at Arnold School
British military personnel killed in World War I
1892 births
1918 deaths
People from Blackburn
Royal Army Service Corps soldiers
British Army recipients of the Victoria Cross
Military personnel from Lancashire